Alexandra Heidrich (born ?) is a German female canoeist who won six medals at individual senior level at the Wildwater Canoeing World Championships and European Wildwater Championships.

References

Living people
German female canoeists
Place of birth missing (living people)
Date of birth missing (living people)
Year of birth missing (living people)